HARK, is the third studio album by The Doppelgangaz. It was released on March 12, 2013, by their label Groggy Pack Entertainment, LLC. The album was entirely produced by The Doppelgangaz. They've released music videos on YouTube for the songs "Hark Back", "Oh Well", "Skin Yarmulke", "Barbiturates" and "Sun Shine".

Track listing
 Doppel Hobble - 1:30
 Skin Yarmulke - 2:30
 Hark Back - 4:26
 Us 2 Da Man - 3:20
 Taking Them Pills - 1:19
 Oh Well - 3:25
 Sugar Awn Eht - 3:16
 Barbiturates - 3:23
 Harken Forward - 1:21
 On The Rag - 4:48
 Smang Life - 4:42
 Sun Shine - 3:46

References
The Doppelgangaz Get Personal and Aggressive on ‘HARK’ (MTV)
Video: The Doppelgangaz, “Hark Back”  (The Fader)

External links
 http://thedoppelgangaz.bandcamp.com

2013 albums
The Doppelgangaz albums